William Fahey (23 May 1880 – 6 December 1937) was an Australian rules footballer who played with South Melbourne in the Victorian Football League (VFL).

Notes

External links 

1880 births
1937 deaths
Australian rules footballers from Melbourne
Sydney Swans players
People from Dandenong, Victoria